Damon D'Oliveira is a Canadian actor and film and television producer, best known as a partner with Clement Virgo in the production firm Conquering Lion Pictures.

Originally from Guyana, D'Oliveira moved to Canada in 1976. He had acting roles in stage, film and television in the 1980s, and was credited as an associate producer on Darrell Wasyk's 1990 film H, before being admitted into the Canadian Film Centre's program for filmmakers of colour in 1991 alongside classmates including Virgo, Robert Adetuyi, Mina Shum and Stephen Williams.

His first film production credit was on Virgo's 1993 short film Save My Lost Nigga Soul. He has since been a producer of Virgo's films Rude, Love Come Down, Lie with Me, Poor Boy's Game and The Book of Negroes, as well as John Greyson's films The Law of Enclosures and Proteus. Rude and Love Come Down were both Genie Award nominees for Best Picture.

As an actor, D'Oliveira's roles have included voice roles in Rupert, Chilly Beach, Monster Force, Tales from the Cryptkeeper and Donkey Kong Country, guest roles in Adderly, Neon Rider, Night Heat, War of the Worlds, Street Legal, Side Effects, Due South, TekWar, Forever Knight, Traders, The City, Queer as Folk, Show Me Yours, ZOS: Zone of Separation and The Border, and the films Uncut, Getting Away with Murder and Bollywood/Hollywood.

Openly gay, he is married to film director and screenwriter Maxime Desmons.

Filmography

Producer
 1993 - Save My Lost Nigga Soul 
 1995 - Rude
 2000 - Love Come Down
 2000 - The Law of Enclosures
 2003 - Proteus
 2005 - Lie with Me
 2007 - Poor Boy's Game
 2008 - Bonne mère (Short)
 2008 - Baggage (Short)
 2009 - Somebody Is Watching Us (Short)
 2010 - Subway Harmonies (Short)
 2011 - Au plus proche (Short)
 2014 - What We Have
 2015 - The Book of Negroes (TV Mini-Series)
 2018 - The Grizzlies
 2021 - Wildhood
 2022 - Brother

Actor
 1988 - Short Circuit 2 as 'Bones'
 1990 - Deep Sleep as Angel
 1994 - Exotica as David / Man At Opera
 1994 - Back in Action as Gantry
 1994 - Trial by Jury as Rafael, Juror
 1995 - Jungleground as 'Blackjack'
 1996 - Getting Away with Murder as Electronic Salesman
 1996 - Bogus as Office Worker
 1997 - Uncut as Peter Denham
 1997 - My Teacher Ate My Homework as Doctor
 1997-2000 - Donkey Kong Country (TV Series) - Funky Kong / Eddie, The Mean Old Yeti (voice)
 1998 - Double Take as Raul
 1999 - The Five Senses as Todd
 1999 - Angel in a Cage as Lucio
 2001 - Full Disclosure as Marek
 2001 - Glitter as Movie Producer
 2002 - Bollywood/Hollywood as Stevie Sood
 2004 - New York Minute as News Broadcaster
 2008 - Chilly Beach: The Canadian President as Constable Al (voice)
 2018 - 72 Hours  as Ravi (Season 1 Episode 1- Burning Obsession)

References

External links

Canadian male film actors
Canadian male stage actors
Canadian male television actors
Canadian male voice actors
Film producers from Ontario
Canadian television producers
Canadian Film Centre alumni
Canadian gay actors
Guyanese emigrants to Canada
Living people
Year of birth missing (living people)
LGBT film producers
LGBT television producers
Guyanese people of Portuguese descent
Canadian people of Portuguese descent
21st-century Canadian LGBT people